The "Peronist March" is the anthem of the Peronist movement and the official song of the Justicialist Party of Argentina, previously known as the Peronist Party. Originally composed as a football club anthem by Juan Raimundo Streiff in the 1930s, its current lyrics, alluding to President Juan Domingo Perón and the movement he led and founded, were written by education minister Oscar Ivanissevich in 1948 and first recorded by Hugo del Carril in 1949.

Since its adoption by the Peronist movement, it has been re-recorded in various styles, such as tango and folk, and more contemporary versions in cumbia and rock. There is also a version dedicated to Eva Perón, called "Evita Capitana" ("Captain Evita"), which was the official anthem of the Female Peronist Party and has become popular among Peronist feminists. In addition, a third version exists called "Marcha Perón-Ibáñez" ("Perón-Ibáñez March"), which references the then President of Chile, Carlos Ibáñez del Campo and the friendship between the two leaders and countries. The lyrics to this version were written by Alberto Marino and performed by Héctor Ángel Benedetti in 1953.

Lyrics

Lyrics to "Captain Evita"

Lyrics to "Perón-Ibáñez March"

References

External links
Marcha Peronista on YouTube
Evita Capitana on YouTube
Marcha Perón-Ibáñez on YouTube

Argentine songs
Political party songs
Songs about presidents
1948 songs